Rosalind Eleazar is an English stage and screen actress. She trained at London Academy of Music and Dramatic Art, graduating in 2015. Her TV roles include Christine in the BBC series Rellik, Jacky Bast in Howards End, Kate in the ITV series Deep Water, as well as roles in NW, National Treasure and Harlots. Eleazar has appeared in The Starry Messenger at the Wyndham's Theatre and Plaques and Tangles at The Royal Court Theatre. Eleazar's debut feature film role was as Agnes in The Personal History of David Copperfield by Armando Iannucci. Her father was Ghanaian.

Awards and honours 
 2015 Spotlight Prize Best Actor
 2018 Screen Nation Rising Star
2020 Black British Theatre Awards - Nominee for Best Supporting Actress 
2021 Clarence Derwent Award for Best Supporting Female

Filmography

Film

Stage
Dido in 15 Heroines at the Jermyn Street Theatre in 2020.

Yelena in Uncle Vanya at the Harold Pinter Theatre in London (2020).

Television

References

External links

Year of birth missing (living people)
Living people
Black British actresses
21st-century English actresses
English stage actresses
English television actresses
English film actresses
Alumni of the London Academy of Music and Dramatic Art
English people of Nigerian descent
English people of Ghanaian descent